A Manhattan Knight is a 1920 American silent mystery film directed by George Beranger and starring George Walsh, Virginia Hammond, William H. Budd, Warren Cook, Jack Hopkins, and William T. Hayes. It is based on the 1911 novel Find the Woman by Gelett Burgess. The film was released by Fox Film Corporation in March 1920.

Cast
George Walsh as John Fenton
Virginia Hammond as Belle Charmion
William H. Budd as Gordon Brewster
Warren Cook as Their Uncle
Jack Hopkins as Crook Butler
William T. Hayes as The Family Doctor
Cedric Ellis as A Medium
Charles Slattery as Detective
Louis Wolheim as Mangus O'Shea
John Raymond as Stool Pigeon
Walter Mann as Sproul
Pauline Garon as His Daughter
Billy Sullivan as Her Sweetheart
L.J. O'Connor as Another Detective

Preservation
The film is now considered lost.

References

External links

1920 mystery films
Fox Film films
American mystery films
1920 films
American silent feature films
American black-and-white films
Lost American films
Films based on American novels
1920 lost films
1920s American films
Silent mystery films
1920s English-language films